Q was a UK music channel based on Q Magazine, launched on 2 October 2000. It was operated by Box Television, and specialised in indie, rock and alternative.

It was available in the UK on Sky channel 364 and Virgin Media channel 338. In Ireland, it was available on UPC Ireland channel 714 and in Iceland on Síminn. It is also available in South Africa on TopTV channel 503.

The channel was also called Q The Music (cue the music), which was the channel's slogan.

The channel played a wide variety of music, predominantly bands like Snow Patrol, Coldplay, and Stereophonics.

History
Q was launched on 2 October 2000. In common with other EMAP channels, Q was originally a jukebox channel, where music video selections made were by the viewers using premium rate phone lines; however this element was dropped in 2004.

On 3 July 2012, Q closed and was replaced with Heat, a celebrity news and music TV channel.

FHM TV
For a few years, much of the prime time output of the channel was instead given over to FHM TV, broadcasting between 4pm and 6am based on another magazine (also by EMAP), which specialised mainly on females in music videos. However in October 2007, the FHM TV block on Q was dropped and Q regained its full hours.

References

External links
Q TV

Bauer television channels
Music video networks in the United Kingdom
Defunct television channels in the United Kingdom
Television channels and stations disestablished in 2012
Television channels and stations established in 2000